Astilbe  is a genus of 18 species of rhizomatous flowering plants within the family Saxifragaceae, native to mountain ravines and woodlands in Asia and North America. Some species are known by the common names false goat's beard and false spirea.

These hardy herbaceous perennials are cultivated by gardeners for their large, handsome, often fern-like foliage and dense, feathery plumes of flowers. They are widely adapted to shade and water-logged conditions, hence they are particularly associated with pond-side planting. They also tolerate clay soils well. Numerous hybrid cultivars have been raised. Flowers of at least some Astilbe species have a strong and pleasant aroma. Some species, including Astilbe rivularis, are used in traditional medicine.

Species
Species of Astilbe include:
Astilbe biternata (Vent.) Britton ex Kearney – Appalachian false goat's beard
Astilbe chinensis (Maxim.) Franch. & Sav.
Astilbe crispa (Arends) Bergmans 
Astilbe glaberrima Nakai
Astilbe grandis Stapf ex E. H. Wilson – Korean false goat's beard
Astilbe japonica (C.Morren & Decne.) A.Gray
Astilbe longicarpa (Hayata) Hayata
Astilbe macroflora Hayata 
Astilbe microphylla Knoll
Astilbe microphylla var. riparia Hatus. 
Astilbe platyphylla H. Boiss. 
Astilbe rivularis Buch.-Ham. ex D. Don 
Astilbe rivularis var. angustifoliolata H. Hara
Astilbe rivularis var. myriantha (Diels) J. T. Pan 
Astilbe rubra Hook. f. & Thomson – false goat's beard
Astilbe sikokumontana Koidz.   
Astilbe simplicifolia Makino – entire-leaf false goat's beard
Astilbe thunbergii (Siebold & Zucc.) Miq.   
Astilbe thunbergii var. congesta H. Boissieu
Astilbe thunbergii var. fujisanensis (Nakai) Ohwi 
Astilbe thunbergii var. hachijoensis (Nakai) Ohwi 
Astilbe thunbergii var. kiusiana Hara
Astilbe thunbergii var. longipedicellata Hatus.
Astilbe thunbergii var. okuyamae (Hara) Ohwi 
Astilbe thunbergii var. shikokiana (Nakai) Ohwi 
Astilbe thunbergii var. terrestris (Nakai) Ohwi

Cultivar groups
Commonly accepted cultivar groups are:

Astilbe Arendsii Group
Astilbe Crispa Group
Astilbe Japonica Group
Astilbe Simplicifolia Group

The following varieties and cultivars have gained the Royal Horticultural Society's Award of Garden Merit:

'Brautschleier' (Arendsii Group) - white 
'Bronce elegans' (Simplicifolia) - salmon pink 
A. chinensis var. pumila - mauve 
A. chinensis var. taqueti 'Purpurlanze' - red/purple 
A. chinensis var. taqueti 'Superba' - rose/mauve
'Fanal' (Arendsii) - crimson 
A. glaberrima var. saxatilis - pink & white, prostrate 
'Rheinland' (Japonica) - pale pink 
A. simplicifolia 
'Sprite' (Simplicifolia) - pale pink 
'Straussenfeder' (Thunbergii) - pink 
A. × crispa 'Perkeo' (pink)

Cultivation
The UK National Collection of Astilbe is held by Malcolm Pharoah at Marwood Hill Gardens in Marwood, near Barnstaple, North Devon.

References

External links

Flora of China: Astilbe

 
Saxifragaceae genera